KACV-FM (89.9 FM, "FM90") is a college radio station in Amarillo, Texas, United States. The station is owned and operated by the city's community college, Amarillo College along with its television partner, PBS station KACV-TV (channel 2). The station is also an affiliate of the National Public Radio. Both KACV-FM-TV operate studios at Gilvin Broadcast Center on Amarillo College's Washington Street campus, while KACV-FM's transmitter is located north of Amarillo in unincorporated Potter County.

Founded in 1976, the station is a typical, unaffiliated campus radio station, airing alternative rock music during the weekdays.  The station airs the syndicated "Dr. Demento" radio program, a feature of KACV-FM since 1987. Due to a special contract, KACV was the only station continuing to air Dr. Demento after June 6, 2010, after Dr. Demento canceled his terrestrial show and moved exclusively to the Internet. KACV carried the Internet version of the show, presumably censored to meet FCC guidelines, until it left KACV in January 2011.

See also
 KACV-TV

References

External links 
KACV-FM official website

ACV-FM
Radio stations established in 1976
ACV-FM
1976 establishments in Texas
NPR member stations